Portbou is a town in the Alt Empordà county, in the Province of Girona, Catalonia, Spain. It has a population of  people.

Portbou is located near the French border in the Costa Brava region, and frequently serves as a dropping off point for SNCF trains coming from Cerbère in France.

Portbou was a small but important point for the Republicans during the Spanish Civil War, as it was one of the few places from where they could get supplies from abroad. Portbou is also where German philosopher Walter Benjamin committed suicide and was buried in 1940. There is a monument in his honor, by Dani Karavan.

Transport 
The Portbou railway station is a break-of-gauge station. It contains a major rail freight transfer facility, and a large passenger station built to support customs and immigration. The customs and immigration facilities are no longer required as both France and Spain are Schengen Area members.

A pair of railway tunnels connect Portbou with Cerbère in France. One tunnel contains a standard gauge track, and one an Iberian gauge track. Local Spanish trains either terminate at Portbou or run through to Cerbère, where the Iberian gauge tracks ends, and French trains either terminate at Cerbère or continue to Portbou.
Portbou has a TALGO Automatic Track Gauge Changeover System facility, for use by through trains between France and Spain.

The road connection to Cerbère in France is via the Coll dels Balitres (163 m). This route is longer (7 km) than the rail route (1.8 km).

The GR 92 long distance footpath, which roughly follows the length of the Mediterranean coast of Spain, starts at Portbou.

Demography

Notable people 
 

 Clemente Cerdeira Fernández, (1887–1947), Spanish Arabist and diplomat
 Àngels Santos Torroella, Catalan painter

References

 Panareda Clopés, Josep Maria; Rios Calvet, Jaume; Rabella Vives, Josep Maria (1989). Guia de Catalunya, Barcelona: Caixa de Catalunya.  (Spanish).  (Catalan).

External links 

 Official website 
 Government data pages 

Municipalities in Alt Empordà
Populated places in Alt Empordà
France–Spain border crossings